Bill Rentmeester (born April 25, 1986) is a former American football fullback. He was signed by the San Diego Chargers as an undrafted free agent in 2009. He played college football at Wisconsin and high school football at Beaver Dam High School.

Rentmeester has also been a member of the San Francisco 49ers and Las Vegas Locomotives.

College career
Although Rentmeester's primary duty was to block for former Wisconsin Badgers running back P.J. Hill, Rentmeester was able to total 116 Rushing yards and 1 Touchdown in his career. He wore number 34.

Professional career

San Diego Chargers
After going unselected in the 2009 NFL Draft, Rentmeester was signed by the San Diego Chargers as an undrafted free agent. He was waived on August 6.

San Francisco 49ers
Rentmeester signed with the San Francisco 49ers on August 16, 2009 after the team waived injured running back Thomas Clayton. He was released on September 5, as the team had to have its final roster set.

References

External links
San Francisco 49ers bio

1986 births
Living people
People from Beaver Dam, Wisconsin
Players of American football from Wisconsin
American football fullbacks
Wisconsin Badgers football players
San Diego Chargers players
San Francisco 49ers players
Las Vegas Locomotives players
Sportspeople from the Milwaukee metropolitan area